National Route 153 is a national highway of Japan connecting Higashi-ku, Nagoya and Shiojiri, Nagano in Japan, with a total length of 213.4 km (132.6 mi).

References

153
Roads in Aichi Prefecture
Roads in Nagano Prefecture